The Australian String Quartet (ASQ) is a chamber music group founded in 1985 and based at the University of Adelaide, South Australia. It delivers an artistic program of performances, workshops, commissions, digital content and education projects across Australia and abroad.

The quartet performs on a matched set of string instruments hand crafted by Giovanni Battista Guadagnini between c.1743-1784 in Italy. The earliest of these is a cello (c. 1743), and a violin (1748-49), both made in Piacenza. The viola (1783) and another violin (1784) were made in Turin.

The ASQ regularly tours Australia and the world. The current members are Dale Barltrop (violin), Francesca Hiew (violin), Christopher Cartlidge (viola) and Michael Dahlenburg (cello).

Guest artists have included pianists Angela Hewitt, Angela Lam and Piers Lane, mezzo-soprano Anne Sofie von Otter, clarinettists Michael Collins and Ashley Smith, violist Brett Dean and cellist Pieter Wispelwey.

In the media

In 2014-15, a documentary Highly Strung was made about the ASQ that documented the break-up of the quartet as it was then, plus the making of a copy of the cello by Italian luthier Roberto Cavagnoli. The documentary was made by acclaimed film-maker Scott Hicks. It introduces us to Ulrike Klein, a board member of the ASQ, and the members of the quartet.

Awards and nominations

APRA Music Awards 

The APRA Awards are presented annually from 1982 by the Australasian Performing Right Association (APRA). They include the Art Music Awards (until 2009 Classical Music Awards) which are distributed by APRA and the Australian Music Centre (AMC).

!
|-
| 2005 || Tales of the Supernatural (Andrew Ford) for Australian String Quartet, Jane Edwards || Vocal or Choral Work of the Year ||  || 
|-
| 2014 || String Quartet No 5 (Andrew Ford) for Australian String Quartet || Work of the Year – Instrumental ||  || 
|-
| 2021 || A Room of Her Own (Anne Cawrse) for Australian String Quartet || Work of the Year: Chamber Music ||  ||

ARIA Music Awards
The ARIA Music Awards is an annual awards ceremony that recognises excellence, innovation, and achievement across all genres of Australian music. They commenced in 1987.

! 
|-
| 2017
| Migration (with Slava Grigoryan)
| ARIA Award for Best World Music Album
| 
| 
|-

References

External links
 

APRA Award winners
Musical groups established in 1985
Australian string quartets
1985 establishments in Australia